The 1969–70 St. John's Redmen basketball team represented St. John's University during the 1969–70 NCAA University Division men's basketball season. The team was coached by Lou Carnesecca in his fifth year at the school before he left to become the head coach of the New York Nets in the American Basketball Association. St. John's home games were played at Alumni Hall and Madison Square Garden.

Roster

Schedule and results

|-
!colspan=9 style="background:#FF0000; color:#FFFFFF;"| Regular Season

|-
!colspan=9 style="background:#FF0000; color:#FFFFFF;"| NIT Tournament

Team players drafted into the NBA

References

St. John's Red Storm men's basketball seasons
St. John's
St. John's
St John
St John